The 1984 Maryland Terrapins football team represented the University of Maryland, College Park in the 1984 NCAA Division I-A football season. The Terrapins won the Atlantic Coast Conference (ACC) for the second consecutive season.

Schedule

A.Clemson was under NCAA probation, and was ineligible for the ACC title. Therefore this game did not count in the league standings.

Games summaries

Miami (FL)

The biggest highlight of the season was Frank Reich's comeback against the defending national champion Miami Hurricanes on November 10, 1984, at the Orange Bowl Stadium. Reich came off the bench to play for Stan Gelbaugh, who had previously replaced him as the starter after Reich separated his shoulder in the fourth week of the season against Wake Forest.   Miami quarterback Bernie Kosar led the 'Canes to a 31–0 lead at halftime. At the start of the third quarter, Reich led the Terrapins on a scoring drive after scoring drive.  Three touchdowns in the third quarter and a fourth at the start of the final quarter turned what was a blowout into a close game.  With the score 34–28 Miami, Reich hit Greg Hill with a 68-yard touchdown pass which deflected off the hands of Miami safety Darrell Fullington to take the lead. Maryland scored once more to cap an incredible 42–9 second half, and won the game 42–40, completing what was then the biggest comeback in NCAA history.

Roster

1984 Terrapins in professional football

Stan Gelbaugh played for the Saskatchewan Roughriders in 1986 and then in the NFL for the Buffalo Bills, Phoenix Cardinals, and Seattle Seahawks.

References

Maryland
Maryland Terrapins football seasons
Atlantic Coast Conference football champion seasons
Sun Bowl champion seasons
Maryland Terrapins football